DWPB (107.3 FM) D'Ani Kita Radio is a radio station owned by the Department of Agriculture and operated by Forefront Broadcasting Company. The station's studio and transmitter are located inside the Batangas State University campus, Batangas City. Formerly a college radio of Batangas State University, the station was relaunched under the Department of Agriculture.

References

Radio stations in Batangas
Radio stations established in 2020